Express Coach Builders is an Australian bus bodybuilder in Macksville.

History
Express Coach Builders was originally formed as Nambucca River Engineering in 1971. It primarily built custom bodies on mid-sized chassis, initially Leylands and later Hinos, Mercedes, Isuzus, Kamaz although it did body full sized 40foot chassis in both bus and coach configuration.

After being placed in receivership in 1995 it was restructured and renamed Express Coach Builders. In October 2007 the 500th body was completed.

References

External links
Bus Australia gallery

Bus manufacturers of Australia